Dracula the Un-dead is a 2009 sequel to Bram Stoker's classic 1897 novel Dracula. The book was written by Bram Stoker's great-grandnephew Dacre Stoker and Ian Holt. Previously, Holt had been a direct-to-DVD horror screenwriter, and Stoker a track and field coach.

In the novel's afterword, the authors discuss the many alterations made to the original novel's events, due to the many inconsistencies in the original and the desire for the Stoker family to reassert control over Dracula fiction.


Plot
Twenty-five years have passed since the vampire Count Dracula met his end at the hands of Jonathan Harker and Quincey Morris. Though they were victorious in their quest, the band of heroes has now become a broken shadow of its former-self; Jack Seward has become a morphine addict obsessed with stamping out the undead, Arthur Holmwood hides behind his loveless marriage and Jonathan Harker drowns his sorrows and insecurities in alcohol and prostitutes over Mina's remaining taint from Dracula, which has caused her to retain her youth.

The novel begins with Seward tracking down Elizabeth Báthory, whom he believes is a vampire. After seeing her bathe in a young woman's blood, he tracks her to a theater in Paris. Quincey Harker, son to Jonathan and Mina, is in Paris having been forced to attend law school instead of pursuing a career in theater. Quincey learns that Basarab, a Romanian actor who is taking Europe by storm, is in town to perform in Richard III, and vows to see his performance no matter how it enrages his father, whom he has grown to despise. To his surprise, he is summoned by Basarab to his dressing room, where they strike up an unlikely friendship. However, they are disturbed when Báthory's vampiric attendants attempt to attack Basarab, although they are thwarted by Seward. As Seward chases the vampires, he is struck and killed by a carriage in which Báthory and the vampires escape. Abraham Van Helsing, now a sickly old man, returns to London after hearing of Seward's death. He believes that Dracula has returned.

Quincey, through Basarab's urgings, becomes involved with the Lyceum Theater where Bram Stoker is currently trying to put together a stage performance of his failed novel. Quincey is shocked to find his parents are characters in the novel, as are their former friends. Quincey fervently reads the novel and researches Dracula, who he finds was a real-life Romanian prince nicknamed Vlad the Impaler. After the actor playing Dracula quits, he approaches Basarab about playing the role; Basarab grows angry with the portrayal of Dracula as a monster, and decides to accept the role if only to right what he sees as slander to a national hero. Soon after, Quincey learns in the newspaper that his father was murdered in Piccadilly after being impaled on a large wooden stake.

While Quincey travels home, Mina is brought into the coroner's office to identify Jonathan's body. The detective, Cotford, insinuates that Van Helsing had orchestrated both Jonathan and Seward's death. Years ago, Cotford worked the Jack the Ripper case and had nearly caught him; his top suspect was Abraham Van Helsing because of the gross mutilations he performed on corpses that caused him to lose his medical license. Mina returns home to prepare for Jonathan's funeral, and finds Quincey there and enraged; he had smashed open his father's off-limits safe and found inside the journals that he and his friends kept while on their quest to hunt down Dracula as well as his mother's affair with the Count. Consumed with grief over the misplaced anger toward his father and the betrayal that caused his father to become a drunkard, Quincey vows to hunt Dracula down and kill him himself.

After leaving his mother behind, Quincey is accosted by Van Helsing, who threatens the boy to give up his thirst for vengeance or suffer for it. Late that same night, Báthory sneaks into Mina's room and rapes her (although Mina at first believes it is the spirit of Jonathan or Dracula). Mina also consumed some of Báthory's blood, giving her visions of her horrible past as an abused 15-year-old wife of a depraved despot and shunned by her family because of her homosexual tendencies.

Quincey pays a visit to Arthur Holmwood, who initially rebuff's Quincey's plea for help. Arthur changes his mind after a terrifying dream in which a skeletal Lucy Westenra attacks him. Unable to find Quincey, Arthur turns to Mina to help locate the boy before Dracula can get to him; Mina senses he has gone back to the Lyceum Theater in order to hopefully get Basarab to help him destroy the Count. During a dress rehearsal, Báthory confronts Basarab and the two duel in a back room of the theater. Báthory outmaneuvers Basarab and smashes an oil lantern at his feet, catching him and the theater on fire. Quincey arrives to find the theater in flames, and despite his best efforts he cannot find his friend and is forced to escape the theater. Outside, Arthur and Mina, who feared Quincey dead, are overjoyed to see him alive, although Arthur is suspicious to see that he is completely unharmed. Cotford, who received a message that the key to the Ripper murders would be at the theater, tries to arrest Arthur, Mina and Quincey, but Arthur and Quincey manage to escape, while Mina is arrested for the murder of one of Báthory's vampires.

After eluding the police, Quincey and Arthur break into Seward's place and find that he was in correspondence with Basarab, which puzzles Quincey. Arthur receives a message from Van Helsing, saying he has been attacked, and to meet him at a hotel where he is staying under Renfield's name. Luckily, Quincey and Arthur manage to get into the hotel because of Arthur's social status and are taken to Van Helsing's room. Van Helsing reveals that it was he who gave their story to Bram Stoker as a sort of guide to future generations who may encounter the undead, and asks that the two "join us". Van Helsing then drops a bombshell; Dracula's true name is Vladimir Basarab, the same man Quincey saw as a mentor. Arthur furiously shoves the old man away and Van Helsing reveals himself as a newly turned vampire. During the struggle, Van Helsing manages to shoot Arthur, who collapses. Van Helsing gives Quincey one last chance to join their side, which he refuses. As Van Helsing is about to drink Quincey's blood, Arthur manages to shoot Van Helsing with a crossbow and, in a rage over their former mentor allying himself with Dracula, tackles Van Helsing out a window, where they both fall to their deaths.

Meanwhile, as Cotford and a handful of officers take Mina back for questioning, they are overcome by an eerie red fog and, one by one, the officers are picked off by Báthory, who is in the form of a gargoyle. Realizing that Van Helsing's earlier rants about the supernatural were real after all, Cotford attempts to save Mina by getting her on one of London's underground trains. He tries to fight the monster, stabbing it in the leg with a broken sword, but is decapitated by the gargoyle's tail. Mina manages to get on a train, where she is attacked by Báthory; just as Báthory is set to kill Mina, Dracula appears. It is revealed that, by marriage, Dracula and Báthory are cousins. However, even though both became vampires, Dracula still saw himself as a soldier of God, while Báthory spurned God and all those who worshiped Him. The two fight, in which Dracula is overpowered and nearly killed; only Mina's quick thinking saves him by having Báthory yanked from the train via a loose cable. The sword in her leg makes contact with the tracks, causing Báthory to burst into flames.

At Dracula's insistence, Mina takes him to Carfax Abbey to make a final stand against Báthory; during the trip, we learn that the real reason Dracula came to London 25 years ago was to hunt down Báthory, who was slaughtering women under the guise of Jack the Ripper, and though Dracula admits the heroes' acts were noble and chivalrous, they were hunting the wrong monster (the deaths on the Demeter – the ship that brought Dracula to England – were actually caused by a virus among the crew; Dracula was forced to feed on Lucy after his arrival in England simply because of starving after so long without blood). Quincey also heads for Carfax, hoping to kill Dracula before he gets to his mother. Dracula appeals to Mina to let him turn her into a vampire, so that even if Báthory kills him, Mina will be able to destroy her in her weakened state. Mina initially refuses, believing Dracula is the one who viciously murdered Jonathan and Seward; Dracula denies this, saying that he would never hurt them for an unspecified reason. However, her fear for Quincey's life forces her to give in and Dracula finally turns Mina into a vampire; shockingly, to Dracula, consuming the tainted blood he put into Mina years ago heals him and renews his strength. Quincey arrives at Carfax and is heartbroken to see his mother dead in a coffin. However, she awakens when blood from Quincey's wounds falls on her face and she nearly attacks her son. Overcome with grief, Quincey spurns what his mother has become and, despite her pleas, chases off after Dracula.

Báthory and Dracula engage in a bloody duel, in which Báthory nearly kills Dracula with the same kukri blade that Jonathan used against him 25 years ago. However, Dracula, being the more skilled swordsman, outmaneuvers Báthory and impales her with his broken sword, stabbing her in the chest with the kukri blade. Báthory collapses and crumples to dust as Quincey confronts Dracula, who refuses to defend himself. Dracula's compassion is revealed with a thunderous revelation; that Quincey is truly Dracula's son and not Jonathan's; even though he loved him dearly, he would never harm Quincey or those who raised him. Mina confirms this fact and suddenly the true reason behind the disintegration of his family and their friendships was laid bare. Refusing to become the monster that his father became, Quincey leaves both behind. Dracula takes solace that his son is safe and succumbs to his wounds, falling off a cliff and bursting into flames as the sun rises. Mina, forsaken by her son and cursed to live eternally, follows Dracula off of the cliff to be reunited with her two loves, Jonathan and Dracula.

Some time later, Quincey manages to board an ocean liner by bribing one of the workers to let him on, hoping for a better life in America, and to be as far away from his family's past as possible. Unknown to him, boxes labelled as property of Vladimir Basarab are also loaded on board; the ocean liner is later revealed to be the RMS Titanic.

Reception
Critical reaction to Dracula the Un-dead has been mixed. Dracula scholar Leslie S. Klinger, writing for the Los Angeles Times, wrote that he did not consider the book to really be a sequel to Dracula because "no author would permit a sequel that boldly claims the original got the story wrong", but that it was "a fine book in its own right, one that pushes the story in unexpected directions while remaining true to the dark heart of the Transylvanian vampire-king".

Michael Sims of The Washington Post wrote, "Stoker and Holt dump everything into their furiously boiling kettle of clichés – bucketfuls of gore, creepy sex, a torture scene that comes across as lesbian vampire porn. ... But I don't mean to complain that this cheeseburger is not caviar. Un-dead is cinematically fast-paced, flying from London to Paris to Transylvania, and the historical texture is mostly convincing".

Sandy Amazeen of Monsters and Critics felt that "the pace is good and there are a few new plot twists, but not enough to make up for the overall canned feel of this disappointing attempt to redraw some old roles".

Bruce G. Smith of Blogcritics wrote, "It's quite realistic, scarily so, which makes Dracula the Un-dead a sequel worthy of the original. The story is a page-turner; the details are gripping; the horror, well, it's horrifying. It's a great book to read – albeit an imperfect one".

Monica Valentinelli of Flames Rising Horror Webzine wrote, "I believe that what they wanted was a book that would do all things for all readers, but in this case I feel that their lofty goals fall short" ... "If you want to pick up Dracula the Un-dead, pick it up for an interesting take on the 'happily-never-after'. Pick it up because you're interested in reading a different take on the vampires that aren't 'pretty' but truly monstrous. For on that note, Dracula the Un-dead does succeed".

Moira Macdonald wrote in the Seattle Times "it's an odd piece of work, bearing about as much resemblance to the original as Bela Lugosi does to Robert 'Twilight' Pattinson".

Amy Gwiazdowski, writing for Bookreporter.com, wrote that: "In the end, Dracula the Un-dead is a fast read and exciting in parts, but I think too much is asked of readers of the original in having to forgo old beliefs of who and what Dracula is. It's best to just enjoy it for what it is: another vampire story for October".

Winnipeg Free Press reviewer Kenneth MacKendrick called it "tempting enough to read and bad enough to be controversial, striking a balance between sensationalism and mediocrity".

References

2009 American novels
American horror novels
Sequel novels
Novels set in the 1910s
Dracula novels
HarperCollins books
Novels set in London
Cultural depictions of Vlad the Impaler
Cultural depictions of Elizabeth Báthory
American vampire novels
Collaborative novels
2009 debut novels